Sergio Escudero Palomo (born 2 September 1989) is a Spanish professional footballer who plays as a left-back for Real Valladolid.

He made over 200 La Liga appearances for Getafe, Sevilla, Granada and Valladolid, winning the Europa League twice with the second of those teams. Abroad, he had a spell in Germany's Bundesliga with Schalke 04, and lifted the DFB-Pokal in 2011.

Club career

Murcia
Born in Valladolid, Castile and León, Escudero joined Real Murcia in 2007 after a six-year youth spell at local Real Valladolid, spending his first season as a senior with the reserves in Segunda División B. On 13 June 2009, he made his debut with the first team, playing the full 90 minutes in a 2–1 home win against UD Salamanca as the hosts had already retained their Segunda División status.

Escudero was definitely promoted to the main squad for the 2009–10 campaign, being the most utilised player in his position (2,250 minutes) as Murcia were eventually relegated after ranking in 20th position. In late March 2010, interest surfaced from Real Madrid, but nothing came of it.

Schalke 04
In the summer of 2010, the 20-year-old Escudero signed with FC Schalke 04 in Germany, alongside compatriots José Manuel Jurado and Raúl González for an undisclosed fee. He made his Bundesliga debut on 26 February 2011, playing 68 minutes in a 1–1 home draw with 1. FC Nürnberg. He finished his first season as a DFB-Pokal winner, coming on as a substitute for Hans Sarpei just before half time in a 5–0 rout of MSV Duisburg in the final on 21 May.

Getafe

Escudero was loaned to Getafe CF in late January 2013, to cover for injured Mané. His maiden appearance in La Liga took place on 2 February, as he started in a 3–1 home victory over Deportivo de La Coruña.

Escudero joined the Madrid outskirts club permanently on 11 July 2013, agreeing to a five-year contract. He scored two goals in his first full season, against FC Barcelona (2–5 home loss) and Sevilla FC (1–0, also at home), the latter all but guaranteeing his team stayed in the top flight for another year.

Sevilla
On 3 July 2015, Escudero moved to fellow league team Sevilla after agreeing to a four-year deal. He netted his first goal for the Andalusians on 29 November, the only in a league fixture against Valencia CF at the Ramón Sánchez Pizjuán Stadium.

Escudero played second-fiddle to Benoît Trémoulinas in his first year, but still managed to play 28 matches in all competitions, including the full 90 minutes of the final of the UEFA Europa League against Liverpool in Basel (3–1 win).

In February 2017, Escudero extended his contract until 2021. In 2019–20 his position was usurped by on-loan Sergio Reguilón; he ended the campaign as a Europa League winner again, unused in the final defeat of Inter Milan.

Later years
On 31 August 2021, free agent Escudero signed a one-year contract with Granada CF also in the top tier. The following 13 July 2022, after their relegation, the 32-year-old returned to Valladolid after 18 years on a two-year deal.

International career
In November 2016, Escudero received his first call-up to the senior Spain squad for matches against Macedonia and England. He took no part in either game.

Career statistics

Club

Honours
Schalke 04
DFB-Pokal: 2010–11

Sevilla
UEFA Europa League: 2015–16, 2019–20

References

External links

1989 births
Living people
Spanish footballers
Footballers from Valladolid
Association football defenders
La Liga players
Segunda División players
Segunda División B players
Real Murcia Imperial players
Real Murcia players
Getafe CF footballers
Sevilla FC players
Granada CF footballers
Real Valladolid players
Bundesliga players
FC Schalke 04 II players
FC Schalke 04 players
UEFA Europa League winning players
Spanish expatriate footballers
Expatriate footballers in Germany
Spanish expatriate sportspeople in Germany